The  Battle of Bucov or Teleajen River (called battle of Bukowo in Polish historiography) was fought during the Moldavian Magnate Wars between the Polish–Lithuanian Commonwealth and the Principality of Wallachia, on October 20, 1600. Polish-Lithuanian forces under the command of Jan Zamoyski defeated the Wallachian forces commanded by Michael the Brave.

The battle was fierce, and lasted several hours. After having sustained heavy losses, Michael the Brave retreated towards Craiova, with the hope of organizing a more efficient resistance.

References

 Dariusz Skorupa, Bitwa pod Bukowem 20 października 1600 r. {w} Staropolska sztuka wojenna XVI-XVII wieku- "Fasciculi Historici Novi", Tom V, 2002

Bukowo
Bukowo
Bukowo
Bukowo
Military history of Romania
History of Muntenia
History of Prahova County
1600 in Europe